Miloš Dragojević (born 3 February 1989) is a Montenegrin football goalkeeper that plays for Budućnost Podgorica.

Club career
Born in Titograd (former name of Podgorica), he played with FK Budućnost Podgorica in the Montenegrin First League before signing with Polish Ekstraklasa side Widzew Łódź in 2012. After one season in Poland, he returned to Montenegro and played with FK Mladost Podgorica. In summer 2014 he moved abroad again, this time to join Serbian SuperLiga side OFK Beograd.

International career
Dragojević made 3 appearances for Montenegro U21 side between 2008 and 2010. He made his debut for the Montenegro national team in a friendly 0–0 tie with Bosnia and Herzegovina on 2 June 2021.

Honours
Budućnost Podgorica
 Montenegrin First League: 2016–17

References

External links
 
 
 

1989 births
Living people
Footballers from Podgorica
Association football goalkeepers
Montenegrin footballers
Montenegro international footballers
Montenegro under-21 international footballers
FK Budućnost Podgorica players
OFK Titograd players
FK Bratstvo Cijevna players
Widzew Łódź players
OFK Beograd players
FK Pelister players
OFK Petrovac players
Montenegrin First League players
Ekstraklasa players
Macedonian First Football League players
Montenegrin expatriate footballers
Expatriate footballers in Poland
Montenegrin expatriate sportspeople in Poland
Expatriate footballers in Serbia
Montenegrin expatriate sportspeople in Serbia
Expatriate footballers in North Macedonia
Montenegrin expatriate sportspeople in North Macedonia